Ashcroft-Cache Creek Journal is a newspaper in Ashcroft, British Columbia published weekly.  The paper is the oldest weekly newspaper in British Columbia founded in 1895. Dr. Frank Stewart Reynolds and, A.H.S. Sroufe, founded the paper The British Columbia Mining Journal. By 1899  the Mining Journal was renamed The Ashcroft Journal

See also
List of newspapers in Canada

References

External links
Ashcroft-Cache Creek Journal  – Official website.

Black Press
Publications established in 1895
1895 establishments in British Columbia
Weekly newspapers published in British Columbia